Bad Boys may refer to:

Film 
 Bad Boys (1961 film), a Japanese film by Susumu Hani
 Bad Boys (1983 film), an American crime drama starring Sean Penn
 Bad Boys (franchise), the American action-comedy series starring Will Smith and Martin Lawrence, it consists of:
 Bad Boys (1995 film), an American action film
 Bad Boys II, a 2003 sequel to the 1995 film
 Bad Boys for Life, a 2020 sequel to the 2003 film
 Bad Boys (soundtrack), a soundtrack album from the 1995 film
 Bad Boys: Miami Takedown, a 2004 video game based on the sequel
 Bad Boys (2003 film), a Finnish crime drama starring Peter Franzén
 Bad Boys, a 2003 Indian Hindi film starring Rakhi Sawant

Music

Albums 
 Bad Boys (Baccara album), or the title song, 1981
 Bad Boys (DeBarge album), 1987
 Bad Boys (Haywire album), 1986

Songs 
 "Bad Boys" (Alexandra Burke song), 2009
 "Bad Boys" (Inner Circle song), 1987, used as the theme song of the TV show Cops and in the 1995 film Bad Boys
 "Bad Boys" (Roxus song), 1991
 "Bad Boys" (Wham! song), 1983
 "Bad Boys" (Zara Larsson song), 2013
 "Bad Boys", a song by Shyne from Shyne
 "Bad Boys", a song by Whitesnake from Whitesnake
 "Bad Boys", a song by Victoria Justice from Victorious 3.0
 "Bad Boys", a song by Geetha Madhuri and Priya Himesh from Businessman "Bad Bad Boys", a song by Midi, Maxi & Efti

 Other uses 
 Bad Boys (basketball), a nickname for the 1980-1994 Detroit Pistons of the NBA
 Bad Boys (manga), a manga series by Hiroshi Tanaka
 Bad Boys (poetry collection), a 1980 book by Sandra Cisneros
 Bad Boys, a Japanese owarai duo who host the variety show AKBingo!See also
 Bad Boys Inc, a British boy band
 Bad Boyes'', a 1980s British children's television series
 Bad Boy (disambiguation)
 Bad Girls (disambiguation)